Lorie is a 1984 Bollywood film directed by Vijay Talwar. The film stars  Shabana Azmi, Farooq Shaikh, Naseeruddin Shah and Rohini Hattangadi among others.

Plot
Geeta Malhotra is depressed after she loses her child and the doctor declares that she will not be able to conceive again with her husband Bhupinder. One day she comes upon a small boy left behind inadvertently in the city bus by his family. She takes him home and starts treating him like her own son. She becomes obsessed with the child. Ultimately, she is arrested and stands trial for abduction.

Cast

Farooq Shaikh ... Bhupinder Singh 
Naseeruddin Shah ... Micky,  Friend of Bhupinder / Defence Lawyer
Shabana Azmi ... Geeta Malhotra 
Swaroop Sampat ... Suman , Micky's Wife
Rohini Hattangadi ... Sharda Malhotra 
Madan Puri ... Chandicharan Kapoor (father of 12 Kids)
Shaukat Azmi... Shanti Shah
Paresh Rawal ... Prosecuting Attorney      
Yunus Parvez ... Adoption Agency Head
Sulabha Deshpande...Shanti, Domestic Maid
Anjan Srivastav ... School Administrator
Javed Khan     ... Bus Conductor
Vikas Anand... Police Inspector
Vinod Sharma ....  Kakkad, Geeta's Uncle
Kiran Vairale.... Majli Kapoor Chandicharan Kapoor Daughter

Songs

References

External links
 

1984 films
1980s Hindi-language films
Films scored by Khayyam